The 2020–21 West Ham United F.C. Women season was the club's 30th season in existence and their third in the FA Women's Super League, the highest level of the football pyramid. Along with competing in the WSL, the club also contested two domestic cup competitions: the FA Cup and the League Cup.

On 29 July 2020, the club announced they had signed a one-year deal with Dagenham & Redbridge F.C. to play at Victoria Road for the season having previously played at the Rush Green training ground stadium.

Manager Matt Beard departed the club by mutual consent on 19 November 2020 with the club sat in 9th place in the league. He had been in charge since the team joined the WSL in June 2018. Billy Stewart assumed the role on an interim basis until Olli Harder, having most recently been assistant manager at Norwegian men's second tier side Sandnes Ulf, was appointed on 23 December 2020.

Squad

FA Women's Super League

Results summary

Results by matchday

Results

League table

Women's FA Cup 

As a member of the top two tiers, West Ham will enter the FA Cup in the fourth round proper. Originally scheduled to take place on 31 January 2021, it was delayed due to COVID-19 restrictions.

FA Women's League Cup

Group stage

Knockout stage

Squad statistics

Appearances 

Starting appearances are listed first, followed by substitute appearances after the + symbol where applicable.

|-
|colspan="14"|Players away from the club on loan:

|-
|colspan="14"|Players who appeared for the club but left during the season:

|}

Transfers

Transfers in

Loans in

Transfers out

Loans out

References 

West Ham United